Sintra is a town and municipality in the Greater Lisbon region of Portugal, located on the Portuguese Riviera. Sintra is one of the most urbanized and densely populated municipalities of Portugal. A major tourist destination famed for its picturesqueness, the municipality has several historic palaces, castles, scenic beaches, parks and gardens.

The area includes the Sintra-Cascais Nature Park through which the Sintra Mountains run. The historic center of the Vila de Sintra is famous for its 19th-century Romanticist architecture, historic estates and villas, gardens, and royal palaces and castles, which resulted in the classification of the town as a UNESCO World Heritage Site. Sintra's landmarks include the medieval Castle of the Moors, the romanticist Pena National Palace and the Portuguese Renaissance Sintra National Palace.

Sintra is one of the wealthiest municipalities in both Portugal and the Iberian Peninsula as a whole. It is home to one of the largest foreign expat communities along the Portuguese Riviera and consistently ranks as one of the best places to live in Portugal.

History

Prehistory to Moorish occupation

The earliest remnants of human occupation were discovered in Penha Verde: these vestiges testify to an occupation dating to the early Paleolithic. Comparable remnants were discovered in an open-air site in São Pedro de Canaferrim, alongside the chapel of the Castelo dos Mouros (Moorish Castle), dating back to the Neolithic, and include decorated ceramics and microlithic flint utensils from the 5th millennium BC.

Ceramic fragments found locally including many late Chalcolithic vases from the Sintra mountains suggest that between the fourth and third millennia B.C. the region (adjacent to the present village of Sintra) was occupied by a Neolithic/Chalcolithic settlement, with characteristics comparable to fortified settlements in Lisbon and Setúbal. The evidence discovered in Quinta das Sequoias and São Pedro de Canaferrim contrasts dramatically with those remnants discovered in the walled town of Penha Verde and the funerary monument of Bella Vista. Traces of several Bronze Age remains were also discovered in many places in the Sintra Mountains, including alongside the town, in the Monte do Sereno area, and a late Bronze Age settlement within the Moorish Castle dating to the 9th–6th centuries B.C.

The most famous object from this period is the so-called Sintra Collar, a middle Bronze Age gold neck-ring found near the city at the end of the 19th century, which since 1900 has been part of the British Museum's collection. Relatively close by, in Santa Eufémia da Serra, is an Iron Age settlement where artifacts from indigenous tribes and peoples of Mediterranean origins (principally from the Punic period) were also discovered. 

These date from the early 4th century B.C., prior to the Romanization of the peninsula, which in the area of Foz do Tejo took place in the middle of the 2nd century B.C. Close proximity to a large commercial centre (Olisipo) founded by the Turduli Oppidani people in the first half of the first millennium B.C., meant that the region of Sintra was influenced by human settlement throughout various epochs, cultures that have left remains in the area to this day. The toponym Sintra derives from the medieval Suntria, and points to an association with radical Indo-European cultures; the word translates as 'bright star' or 'sun', commonly significant in those cultures. Marcus Terentius Varro and Cadizian Lucius Junius Moderatus Columella designated the place "the sacred mountain" and Ptolemy referred to it as the "mountains of the moon".

During the Roman occupation of the peninsula, the region of Sintra was part of the vast Civitas Olisiponense which Caesar (around 49 B.C.) or more likely Octavius (around 30 B.C.) granted the status of Municipium Civium Romanorum. The various residents of the region were considered part of the Roman Galeria and in the present village of Sintra there are Roman remains testifying to a Roman presence from the 1st–2nd centuries B.C. to the 5th century A.D. A roadway along the southeast part of the Sintra Mountains and connected to the main road to Olisipo dates from this period. 

This via followed the route of the current Rua da Ferraria, the Calçada dos Clérigos and the Calçada da Trindade. Following the Roman custom of siting tombs along their roads and near their homes, there is also evidence of inscriptions pertaining to Roman funeral monuments, dating mainly to the 2nd century. The area around the modern town of Sintra, due to its proximity to Olisipo, the ancient name of Lisbon, was always profoundly interconnected with the major settlement, to the point that the Fountain of Armés, a 1st-century fountain in the village of Armés, Terrugem, in Sintra, has been built by Lucius Iulius Maelo Caudicus, an Olisipo flamen, to honour the Roman Emperor Augustus.

It was during the Moorish occupation of Sintra that Greco-Latin writers wrote of the explicit occupation of the area of the town centre. A description by the geographer Al-Bacr, described Sintra as "one of the towns that [are] dependent on Lisbon in Al-Andalus, in proximity to the sea", characterizing it as "permanently submersed in a fog that never dissipates".

During the Reconquista (around the 9th century), its principal centre and castle were isolated by Christian armies. Following the fall of the Caliphate of Córdoba, the King of León, Alfonso VI received in the spring of 1093, the cities of Santarém, Lisbon and the Castle of Sintra. This followed a period of internal instability within the Muslim taifas of the peninsula, and in particular the decision by the ruler of Taifa of Badajoz, Umar ibn Muhammad al-Mutawakkil who, after hesitating from 1090 to 1091, placed his territory under the suzerainty of Alfonso VI when faced with the threat of the Almoravids. Afonso took the cities and the castle of Sintra between 30 April and 8 May 1093, but shortly after their transfer Sintra and Lisbon were conquered by the Almoravids. Santarém was saved by Henry, who Alfonso VI of León and Castile nominated Count of Portugal in 1096, to replace Raymond of Burgundy.

Kingdom

In July 1109, Count Henry reconquered the Castle of Sintra. This was preceded a year before by an attempt by Prince Sigurd the Crusader, son of Magnus III of Norway, to capture the castle from the Moors in the course of his trek to the Holy Land. Sigurd's forces disembarked at the mouth of the Colares River but failed to take the castle. But it was only after the conquest of Lisbon, in October 1147, by Afonso Henriques (supported by Crusaders), that the castle surrendered definitively to the Christians, in November. It was integrated into Christian dominions along with Almada and Palmela after their surrender. Afonso Henriques established the Church of São Pedro de Canaferrim within the walls of the Moorish Castle to mark his success.

On 9 January 1154, Afonso Henriques signed a foral ("charter") for the town of Sintra, with all its respective regalia. The charter established the municipality of Sintra, whose territory encompassed a large area, eventually divided into four great parishes: São Pedro de Canaferrim (in the castle), São Martinho (in the town of Sintra), Santa Maria and São Miguel (in the ecclesiastical seat of Arrabalde). The early municipal seat, the town of Sintra, was the centre of a significant Sephardic community, with a synagogue and quarter. This community was not limited to Sintra town: enclaves are mentioned during the reign of King Denis in Colares, but were heavily pressured by the influx of Christian serfs. Throughout the 12th and 13th centuries, owing to the fertility of the land, various convents, monasteries and military orders constructed residences, estates, water-mills and vineyards. There are municipal records from this period of a number of donations and grants; between 1157 and 1158, Afonso Henriques donated to the master of the Knights Templar, Gualdim Pais, various houses and estates in the centre of Sintra.

In 1210, the Monastery of Santa Cruz in Coimbra acquired four houses in Pocilgais, releasing them in 1230, while in 1264 it controlled homes and vineyards in Almargem. In 1216 the Monastery of São Vicente de Fora (Lisbon) also held a vineyard in Colares and, in 1218, estates in Queluz and Barota. At some time between 1223 and 1245, the Monastery of Santa Maria de Alcobaça held various privileges in the territory. The military Order of Santiago owned an estate in Arrifana in 1260. Many of Afonso Henriques' donations in the 12th century, including privileges assigned to these institutions, were confirmed in 1189 by his son, Sancho I (1185–1211), corresponding to a social, political and economic strategy during the post-Reconquista era. Consequently, after 1261, Sintra had a local administration consisting of an alcalde representing the Crown, and two local judges elected by the public. During the political conflict between King Sancho II (1223–1248) and the Church, the churches of São Pedro and São Martinho, which belonged to the King, were ceded to the Bishop of Lisbon and Sé. Yet the Crown's patrimony was defined early: in 1287, King Denis donated to Queen Elizabeth of Portugal the town, the signeurial holdings and all their associated benefits. Later, these lands were transferred to the young Infante Afonso (later King Afonso IV), and remained in his possession until 1334, before reverting to the ownership of the queen.

The Black Death arrived in Sintra in the 14th century; in 1350, the disease is known to have caused the death of five municipal scribes. Far greater numbers of deaths probably resulted, perhaps owing to the cool climate and humidity, conditions that favoured the rapid spread of the disease.

During the reign of King Ferdinand (1367–1383), Sintra played a part in the controversial marriage of the monarch to Dona Leonor Telles de Menezes. In 1374, the King donated Sintra to the Lady Telles, whom he eventually married in secret in the north of the country. Along with Sintra the King conceded the municipalities of Vila Viçosa, Abrantes and Almada, to the consternation of his private council; following a confrontation the King abandoned his duties and travelled to Sintra, where he remained for a month on the pretext of hunting. As Sintra was located relatively close to Lisbon, many of its people were called to work on projects for the Crown in the capital: in 1373, King Ferdinand decided to wall the city, and requested funds or workers from coastal lands in Almada, Sesimbra, Palmela, Setúbal, Coina, Benavente and Samora Correia, as well as all of Ribatejo, and from the inland areas of Sintra, Cascais, Torres Vedras, Alenquer, Arruda, Atouguia, Lourinhã, Telheiros and Mafra. During the Dynastic Crisis between 1383–1385, Sintra joined Leonor Telles in supporting the proclamation of her daughter, Beatrice, who married John I of Castile, as Queen of Portugal and Castile. After the defeat of the Castilian army at Aljubarrota (August 1385) by Portuguese and English troops, commanded by Nuno Álvares Pereira, Sintra became one of the last places to surrender to the Master of Aviz, later King of Portugal (after 1383).

Joanine and Philippine era

John I (1385–1433), first King of the second dynasty, broke the tradition of transferring Sintra to the Casa da Rainha (Queen's property). Probably around 1383, John I granted the lands of Sintra to Count Henrique Manuel de Vilhena, quickly revoking the decision after Henrique took the Infanta's side during the dynastic quarrel. Sintra, therefore, continued as a possession of the King, who expanded the local estate. Until the end of the 17th century, the royal palace constituted one of the principal residences and summer estates of the court: it was from here that John decided to conquer Ceuta (1415); King Afonso V was born and died at the palace (1433–1481); and here King John II (1481–1495) was acclaimed sovereign.

In a document issued in 1435 by King Edward (1433–1438), the region was described as: "A land of good air and water and of the Comarcas with an abundance in the sea and land [...] our most loyal city of Lisbon being so near, and being in it sufficient diversions, and the distractions of the mountains and hunting...".

During the Portuguese Age of Discovery, several people born in Sintra were written into history. In 1443 Gonçalo de Sintra, squire in the House of the Infante Henry, was sent by the prince as captain of a caravel to the coast of Africa. He explored the region near the Ouro River and eventually died there in 1444. Pedro de Sintra and Soeiro da Costa later mapped most of the Atlantic coast of Africa, around the time of Henry's death in 1460.

At the end of the 15th century the importance of Sintra on official itineraries led Queen Eleanor of Viseu (wife of King John II), then principal benefactor of the Portuguese Misericóridas, to expand her principal institutions in Sintra. The Hospital e Gafaria do Espírito Santo, the only remnant of which left standing is a chapel to São Lázaro, was constructed to provide assistance and support to lepers in the region (the chapel still includes the signets of King John, the pelican, and Queen Leonor, the shrimp). In 1545, the hospital was transferred to the administration of the Santa Casa da Misericórdia of Sintra which was set up by Queen Catherine of Austria, wife of John III.

King Manuel I (1495–1521) enjoyed spending his summers in Sintra, due to its cool climate and abundance of game; as Damião de Góis, his chronicler noted: "because it is one of the places in Europe that is cooler, and cheerful for whichever King, Prince or Master to pass their time, because, in addition to its good airs, that cross its mountains, called by the older peoples the promontory of the moon, there is here much hunting of deer and other animals, and overall many and many good trout of many type, and in which in all of Hispania there can be found, and many springs of water...". Between the 15th and 16th century, after travelling to the Crown of Castile and the Crown of Aragon when being considered as heir to the Kingdoms in 1498, the King transformed and enriched the town and its region with several public works. These included the reconstruction of the old Gothic Church of São Martinho and in 1511 the construction of the Monastery of Nossa Senhora da Pena on the highest peak of the Sintra Mountains, which he then transferred to the Order of Saint Jerome. In the second half of the 16th century, Sintra was a centre for courtesans and members of the aristocracy began building estates and farms within the region. In this rural environment, from 1542, the Viceroy of India, D. João de Castro (1500–1548) began residing at Quinta da Penha Verde, where he collected examples of Portuguese culture of the time, including works by celebrated artist Francisco de Holanda. It was during this cultural Renaissance that the marble chancel sculpted between 1529 and 1532 by Nicolau Chanterene for the chapel of the Monastery of Nossa Senhora da Pena was completed, as was the portico of the Church of Nossa Senhora da Conceição da Ulgueira (1560).

Luís de Camões (1524–1580) referred to the mountains of Sintra in his Os Lusíadas chronicle, as a mythic land ruled by water nymphs. The Renaissance poet Luisa Sigea—Syntrae Aloisiae Sygeae in Paris (1566) and Madrid (1781) referred to Sintra as a "pleasant valley, between cliffs that rise into the heavens...curved in graceful hills among which one can feel the murmur of the waters...[where] everything, in fact, will enchant and perfume the environment with its fragrance and fruit."

With the death of the Cardinal-King Henry (1578–1580), Philip II of Spain inherited the Kingdom of Portugal, initiating a personal union of the crowns that would last until 1640. During this period, Portuguese political power moved from Sintra to Vila Viçosa, principal centre of the House of Braganza, whose dukes, descendants of John of Portugal, were heirs to the throne of Portugal. Following the decision of the Cortes of Tomar in 1581, Phillip as King of Portugal accepted an administration composed of the Portuguese aristocracy. He passed through Sintra around October 1581, visiting the monasteries and churches. It was during this period that cult of Sebastianism, the hope for the return of King Sebastian, came to an end, when several fake "Sebastians" were denounced. In 1585 Mateus Alvares, born on the island of Terceira in the Azores and guardian of the hermitage of São Julio, passed himself off as King Sebastian and created conflict in Sintra, Madra, Rio de Mouro and Ericeira. The Sebastian adventure ended with the hanging of thirty people and the suffering of many more. It was not surprising, therefore, that the visit in 1619 by King Philip IV of Spain (Philip III of Portugal) resulted in many families escaping to the hills. During this union (1580–1640), Sintra was a privileged place for Portuguese "exiles" from the Castilian court; nobles who wished to distance themselves from Spanish nobility would purchase lands in the region, away from court intrigue. At the time of the Restoration, in 1640, the municipality had approximately 4000 residents.

Brigantine era

The war with Spain (1640–1668), the affirmation of Mafra during the reign of John V of Portugal (1706–1750) through the construction of the Palace-Convent, and later the construction of Royal Palace of Queluz in 1747 during the reigns of Joseph I (1750–1777) and Maria I (1777–1816), helped diminish royal visits to the region. During this time there were only two documented visits: in 1652 and 1654, respectively the visit of Queen Luísa de Gusmão and King John IV (1640–1656), and the final burial of King Afonso VI.

Alleging the insanity of the King and the incapacity of the heir, the Duke of Cadaval and the Infante Peter led a coup d'état in 1667 which resulted in the resignation of the Count of Castelo Melhor, Minister of King Afonso VI (1656-1683) and the imprisonment of the monarch. In 1668 the Cortes of Lisbon confirmed the Infante Peter, the king's brother, as regent and heir. Afonso VI lived the rest of his life imprisoned, in the Paço da Ribeira (1667–1669), in the Fortress of Saint John the Baptist in Angra, in the Azores (1669–1674) and in the end, with the discovery of a conspiracy to kill the regent, in the Paço da Vila in Sintra (1674–1683).

From the 17th to the 18th centuries, the region was centre of contemplative religious orders who established convents in Sintra. But it remained a place of myths, with a large, mysterious forest and macabre, gloomy spaces. Father Baião, in his Portugal Cuidadoso (1724) noted: "Next to the Palace of Sintra was a forest, so thick, that during the day, it cast fear in him who entered it. And [King] D. Sebastian was free from these fears, that he would walk at night, through it, many times for two or three hours." Starting in the second half of the 18th century and lasting through the 19th century Sintra became known as a nostalgic and mysterious location described by many foreigners. It was the Romantic Lord Byron's "glorious Eden"; Almeida Garrett's "pleasant resort"; Eça de Queirós's "nest of lovers [where, in] the romantic foliage, the nobles abandoned themselves in the hands of the poets"; or the place where Richard Strauss saw a garden "comparable to Italy, Sicily, Greece or Egypt, a true garden of Klingsor, and there in the heights, a castle of the Holy Grail".

The 1755 Lisbon earthquake, meanwhile, caused the destruction of the centre of Sintra as well as a number of deaths, resulting in building and restoration in the second half of the 18th century. Also in the 18th century, the first industrial building was established in the town: the Fábrica de Estamparia de Rio de Mouro (Mouro River Stamping Factory) in 1778.

The visit of Queen Maria I in 1787 brought about the restoration and redecoration of a few salons and chambers in the municipal buildings. The great festivities of 1795 to celebrate the baptism of the Infante António, son of John VI, resulted in grand balls at the Palace of Queluz. In 1838 the King-Consort, Ferdinand II bought the Monastery of Nossa Senhora da Pena and a vast adjacent area, commissioning the architect José de Costa e Silva to construct an arch joining the two quarters of the Seteais Palace (owned by the Marquis of Marialva), to commemorate the 1802 visit of the Prince and Princess of Brazil, John and Carlota Joaquina, and the subsequent visit of their son, the absolutist King Miguel, in 1830.

During the third quarter of the 18th century and practically all of the 19th century, foreign travellers and Portuguese aristocrats, fired by Romanticism, rediscovered the magic of Sintra, especially in its exotic landscapes and climate. Their visits led to the establishment of several hotels, one of which, Lawrence's, opened in 1764, was still functioning in 2018. In the summer of 1787, William Beckford stayed with the Marquis of Marialva, master of the horse for the kingdom, at his residence of Seteais. At the beginning of the 19th century Princess Carlota Joaquina, wife of Prince Regent John, bought the estate and Ramalhão Palace. Between 1791 and 1793, Gerard Devisme constructed a Neo-Gothic mansion on his extensive estate in the Quinta de Monserrate (later known as the Monserrate Palace). Beckford, who remained in Sintra, rented the property from Devisme in 1794. The landscape, covered in fog, also attracted another Englishman, Sir Francis Cook, who occupied the estate, constructing an oriental pavilion.

The Palace of Pena, Sintra's exemplary Portuguese Romantic symbol, was initiated by the King-Consort Ferdinand, husband of Queen Maria II (1834-1853), a German-born member of the House of Saxe-Cobourg-Gotha. The Palace was built over the remains of the 16th-century monastery of the Order of Saint Jerome, conserving many fundamental aspects, including the church, cloister and a few dependencies. The architecture is eclectic, influenced by many architectural styles, evidence of an era of Romanticism.

The intentional mixture of eclectic styles includes the Neo-Gothic, Neo-Manueline, Neo-Islamic, Neo-Renaissance neo-Islamic, and neo-Manueline styles. Much of this has been evident since major renovations in the 1800s. The design was a project of the Baron von Eschwege and Ferdinand II, to substitute the Sintra National Palace as an alternative to the summer residence in Cascais. After Sintra, the monarchs Louis of Portugal (1861-1889) and Carlos of Portugal (1863-1908) ended their summers with visits to Cascais in the months of September and October.

In 1854, the first contract was signed to construct a rail link between Sintra and Lisbon. A decree signed on 26 June 1855 regulated the contract between the government and Count Claranges Lucotte but was later rescinded in 1861. The connection was finally inaugurated on 2 April 1887.

By the beginning of the 20th century, Sintra was recognized as a summer resort visited by aristocrats and millionaires. Among these, Carvalho Monteiro, owner of a considerable fortune (known as "Monteiro dos Milhões) constructed near the main town, on an estate he bought from the Baroness of Regaleira, a luxurious revivalist palacette, based on a Neo-Manueline architecture.

From the second half of the 19th century into the first decades of the 20th century, Sintra also became a privileged place for artists: musicians such as Viana da Mota; composers such as Alfredo Keil, painters like João Cristino da Silva (author of one of the most celebrated canvases of Portuguese Romantic art, ""), writers such as Eça de Queirós or Ramalho Ortigão, all these people lived, worked or got inspiration from Sintra's landscapes.

Republic

The proclamation of a Portuguese Republic in 1910 transformed the bohemian climate of Sintra. Economic development was now promoted; the potential benefits to the region of growth in agriculture, industry and commerce were promoted to foster development. In 1908 a wine growing zone had been demarcated in Colares. Now a commission was established to monitor the quality of wines and promote their exportation, and in 1914 a commercial association was set up to manage their concession. Meanwhile, in the name of secular and popular progress, parts of the cultural heritage were destroyed, including the annexes of the medieval village bordering the Palace in 1911, while the nave of the Church of the Misericórdia was reduced to the presbytery to allow the road to be widened. The first decades of the 20th century were the time of the fastest urbanization of the town, supported by its rail link to Lisbon and the influx of summer travellers.

During the 1920s damage to culturally important sites led to the creation of institutions to study and protect the vast artistic heritage. The Instituto Histórico de Sintra (Historic Institute of Sintra), under the direction of Afonso de Ornelas, played an important part in this period. Archaeological studies resulted in considerable development: in 1927, Félix Alves Pereira rediscovered the Neolithic settlements of Santa Eufémia, and the first publication of the discoveries at the prehistoric monuments of Praia das Maçãs were completed in 1929. From this time until the 1970s, coastal Sintra was becoming a summer destination, resulting in the building of Portuguese summer residences. Many important Portuguese architects developed projects in the area in the first half of the 20th century, including Raul Lino, Norte Júnior and Tertuliano de Lacerda Marques. 

These projects benefited town and region, increased tourism and attracted as residents many notable Portuguese: historian Francisco Costa; writer Ferreira de Castro; sculptor Anjos Teixeira; architects Norte Júnior and Raul Lino; painters Eduardo Viana, Mily Possoz and Vieira da Silva; poet Oliva Guerra; composer and maestro Frederico de Freitas; historians Felix Alves Pereira and João Martins da Silva Marques.

In 1944, prior to his arrest, Vichy France Prime Minister Pierre Laval had planned to move to an estate in Sintra, where a house had been leased for him.

The 1949 municipal plan by De Groer was devised to protect the town and its neighbourhood from uncontrolled urbanization, and resulted in the maintenance of an environment comparable to 19th century Sintra. Urban anarchy predominated until the middle of the 1980s in the areas adjacent to the main town of Sintra, resulting in the development of new neighbourhoods.

Geography

Physical geography

The Sintra Mountains, a granite massif ten kilometres long - considered the Monte da Lua (Mountain of the Moon), or Promontorium Lunae by the strong local tradition of astral cults - emerge abruptly between a vast plain to the north and the northern margin of the Tagus River estuary, winding in a serpentine cordillera towards the Atlantic Ocean and Cabo da Roca, the most westerly point of continental Europe.

The spectacular relief results from the east-west orientation of the massif's axis, its terminus at the coast, and the nature of igneous rocks, which are resistant to erosion. The Eruptive Massif of Sintra (MES) is a dome structure, formed by layers of sedimentary rocks (limestones and sandstones) from the Upper Jurassic and early Cretaceous periods. A metamorphosed igneous intrusion resulted in a narrow halo of metamorphic rocks, but also strongly deformed these sedimentary layers causing a vertical exposure. While in the south there are enclosed sedimentary layers, to the north (around Praia Grande) the massif is steep. The sedimentary formations, until the beginning of the Upper Cretaceous, are deformed by the intrusion which limits the MES to the end the Cretaceous. Radiometric aging of different rocks from the massif has indicated an age between 80 and 75 million years (confirming the installation of the massive Upper Cretaceous).

The geodynamic conditions that controlled the formation of the MES (correlated with the development of the Sines and Monchique Eruptive Massifs) are associated with the progressive northern expansion of the Atlantic Ocean and the consequent opening of the Bay of Biscay. The Bay of Biscay's expansion resulted in complex tensions responsible for profound fractures in the earth's crust that were conduits for the ascension of magma. Around 80 million years ago this magma spread across the surface as a superficial crust with a depth of 5 kilometres between sedimentary layers (160 to 9 million years old) that were chemically metamorphosed. Over time the magma chamber cooled and crystallized, resulting in conditions that caused the granular textures that characterize the MES. The weaker sedimentary layers were susceptible to erosion, and their products were deposited around their base. Consequently, the massif likely became exposed during the Paleogenic epoch (30 million years ago), known as the Benfica Complex.

Climate & biome

The Mediterranean climate, influenced by the Atlantic and characterized by moderate temperatures and wet winters, is typical of mainland Portugal. Although the climate in the area of Cabo da Roca is close to semi-arid, the Sintra Mountains are considered moderately humid: precipitation in the mountains is higher than in the surrounding areas. The position of the town in the natural landscape of the Sintra Mountains (consisting of an exuberant natural patrimony), is influenced by the existence of a micro-climate. For different reasons (the climate here has been moderated by the Sintra Mountains; the fertility of the soils; and its relative proximity to the Tagus estuary) the region attracted considerable early settlement. Due to its micro-climate, a huge park has developed full of dense foliage with a rich botanical diversity.

The temperate climate and humidity resulting from proximity to the coast favour the growth of a rich mat of forest including Atlantic and Mediterranean species, marking the transition in Portugal from northern to southern vegetation. The Pyrenean oak (Quercus pyrenaica) predominates over great expanses of the rocky heights and sheltered slopes. On moist shady slopes, normally facing north, or in sheltered places, the common oak (Quercus robur) is widespread. In lowland areas and warm places the cork oak (Quercus suber) is common and in limestone areas the Portuguese oak (Quercus faginea) is found. Other species scattered throughout the mountains of Sintra include: maple (Acer pseudoplatanus), common hazel (Corylus avellana), common hawthorn (Crataegus monogyna), European holly (Ilex aquifolium), Portuguese laurel (Prunus lusitanica), Bay laurel (Laurus nobilis), strawberry tree (Arbutus unedo), laurestine (Viburnum tinus), Kermes oak (Quercus coccifera), and Italian buckthorn (Rhamnus alaternus). In the valleys, near watercourses, grow narrow-leaf ash (Fraxinus angustifolia), Grey willow (Salix atrocinerea), European alder (Alnus glutinosa), alder buckthorn (Frangula alnus) and black elderberry (Sambucus nigra).

Since 1966, the Sintra Mountains have been affected by fires that have destroyed a major part of the original forest, which has been substituted by acacia and other fast-growing exotic species.

Human geography

The municipality is administered by 11 civil parish councils, with local authority to administer services and provide local governance, which are:

 Agualva e Mira-Sintra
 Algueirão–Mem Martins
 Almargem do Bispo, Pêro Pinheiro e Montelavar
 Cacém e São Marcos
 Casal de Cambra
 Colares
 Massamá e Monte Abraão
 Queluz e Belas
 Rio de Mouro
 São João das Lampas e Terrugem
 Sintra (Santa Maria e São Miguel, São Martinho e São Pedro de Penaferrim)

Sintra also has numerous hamlets and villages, including the affluent village of Linhó, Sintra.

Sintra's population grew considerably in the late 20th century, rising from about 14% of the Lisbon region to 19%, with the main concentration of resident population found in the important Queluz-Portela corridor, along the southeast corner of the municipality. In this area were concentrated approximately 82% of the municipality's population, the most attractive parishes to live in being São Pedro de Penaferrim, Rio de Mouro, Belas and Algueirão-Mem Martins.

With the decrease in mortality rates, the region has undergone a general increase in infant births, primarily associated with late births, but also an increase in seniors in the community (56.5% in 2001). Yet Sintra is still considered to have a structurally young population, the youngest in the Greater Metropolitan Area of Lisbon. Young adults (30- to 39-year-olds) dominate Sintra's communities, with the parishes of Pêro Pinheiro, Terrugem, São Martinho, São João das Lampas, Santa Maria e São Miguel, Montelavar, Colares, Queluz and Almargem do Bispo all having higher rates of seniors in the population. Approximately 80% of the population are born outside the town, 21% of these being foreign born residents. While the resident population in Lisbon has seen a gentle decrease since the mid-1960s, Sintra has grown comparably.

Urban areas represent  of the municipality, or approximately 17.4% of Sintra's territory; 35% of the population reside in places of between 50,000 and 100,000 inhabitants. Many of these areas are anchored to lines of access, in particular, the Sintra Line and the IC19 motorway which connects the principal towns of Queluz, Agualva-Cacém, Algueirão/Mem Martins, Rio de Mouro and Belas). Many of these urban areas are composed of a fabric of building projects that have historically resulted in dense buildings of concrete, normally seven or more floors in height. The greatest growth in residential homes has occurred in the south of the municipality, in the triangle of São Pedro de Penaferrim, Santa Maria e São Miguel and Casal de Cambra. In addition, there is a major concentration and growth in family dwellings of a seasonal nature, or second homes, in this region, and a proliferation of illegal construction in the parishes of São João das Lampas, São Pedro de Penaferrim, Belas, Agualva-Cacém and Casal de Cambra.

Economy

The growth in tertiary activities has played an important part in the pattern of employment in the region, with commercial, retail and support services predominating. This has been to the detriment of industry, although continuing industrial activities include the transport of materials, mineral processing, the manufacture of machinery and equipment, food-processing, beverage and tobacco companies as well as publishing and printing services. There has also been a dramatic growth in the civil construction industry.

EuroAtlantic Airways has its head office in Sintra.

Tourism is also significant, with the parks and monuments operated by the Parques de Sintra accounting for 3.2 million visitors in 2017, for example.

Transport

Lisbon's commuter railway network (CP Urban Services) provides direct services to Sintra. The journey to Lisbon takes 35–45 minutes. There is alternative transport, taxis, car-sharing services and buses, covering a large area of the district.

, the heritage line runs Wednesday to Sunday in summer months.

Landmarks

Sintra has a great number of preserved or classified architectural buildings:

Prehistoric
 Barreira Megalithic Complex
 Dolmen of Adrenunes
 Dolmen of Agualva
 Dolmen of Estria
 Dolmen of Monte Abraão
 Praia das Maçãs Prehistoric Monument
 Tholos tomb of Monge

Civic
 Aguas Livres Aqueduct-Sintra Line
 Chalet and Garden of the Countess of Edla
 Estate of Penha Verde
 Mansion of Penha Verde
 National Palace of Pena
 National Palace of Queluz
 National Palace of Sintra
 Palacette of the Counts of Almeida-Araújo
 Pillory of Colares
 Quinta da Regaleira including the Palace and the Chapel
 Quinta da Ribafria 
 Monserrate Palace
 Seteais Palace
 Ramalhão Palace

Culture
 The Puppet House of Sintra
 Valdevinos Cultural Association

Military
 Castle of the Moors

Religious
 Church of Santa Maria
 Convent of Penha Longa
 Convento dos Capuchos

Sports
The municipality of Sintra has several sports venues and a wide range of sports facilities for the practice of sports like tennis, golf, swimming, surfing, and equestrianism.

The most reputed competitive sports clubs of Sintra Municipality are:
Sport União Sintrense, a club established on 7 October 1911 that compete in the Campeonato de Portugal, the fourth lay tier of Portuguese football
C.A. Queluz, basketball team based in Queluz
Hockey Club de Sintra, sports club that compete in roller hockey and cycling, being also noted for its artistic roller skating department.
Clube Desportivo de Belas, sports club located in Queluz e Belas
Belas Rugby Clube, rugby union team from Queluz e Belas

In popular culture
Much of the miniseries Gulliver's Travels (1996) was filmed in Sintra, and many of its palaces are shown.

Opel Sintra, a large MPV produced under the German marque Opel for the market in Europe, which was sold in the United Kingdom as the Vauxhall Sintra between 1996 and 1999 by Vauxhall, has a name that was chosen by a computer from a list of short, easy to pronounce words and not after the historic Portuguese town of Sintra.

 In 2018, a board game by German game designer Michael Kiesling, Azul: Stained Glass of Sintra, was named after the town of Sintra.

Twin towns - sister cities
Sintra is twinned with:

 Assilah, Morocco
 Beira, Mozambique
 Bissau, Guinea-Bissau
 Fontainebleau, France
 Goussainville, France
 Havana, Cuba
 Honolulu, United States
 El Jadida, Morocco
 Lobito, Angola
 Namaacha, Mozambique
 Nova Sintra, Cape Verde
 Omura, Japan
 Oviedo, Spain
 Petrópolis, Brazil
 Trindade, São Tomé and Príncipe

Notable people 

 King Afonso V (1432–1481) known by the sobriquet the African, a King of Portugal.
 André de Albuquerque Ribafria (1621-1659), a Portuguese nobleman and military leader. 
 Infanta Maria Francisca (1800 in Queluz – 1834), a Portuguese infanta (princess), daughter of King John VI of Portugal
 Vasco Gonçalves (1921–2005), a Portuguese army officer, participant in the Carnation Revolution, 104th Prime Minister of Portugal, 1974-1975.
 Jorge de Brito (1927 in Queluz – 2006), a businessman & 28th president of S.L. Benfica 
 Clotilde Rosa (1930 in Queluz – 2017), a Portuguese harpist, pedagogue and composer.
 Ruy Belo (1933 – 1978 in Queluz), a Portuguese poet, essayist and existentialist
 Vasco Martins (born 1956 in Queluz), a Cape Verdean musician and composer
 Manuela Bravo (born 1957 in Queluz), singer, sang in the Eurovision Song Contest 1979
 Isabel Stilwell (born 1960), a Portuguese journalist and writer.
 Peter Kember (born 1965), stage name Sonic Boom, an English singer and record producer
 Zé Cabra (born 1965), a former painter and comedy-singer
 Miguel Ribeiro (born 1974) is a Portuguese screenwriter and filmmaker.

Sport 
 Luis Loureiro (born 1976), a former footballer with 295 club caps and 6 for Portugal
 Ricardo Silva (born 1977 in Agualva-Cacém), a former footballer with 293 caps
 Marco Caneira (born 1979), a footballer with 326 club caps and 25 for Portugal
 Bruno Coelho (born 1987), a futsal player with 146 club caps for Benfica and 102 for Portugal 
 Dolores Silva (born 1991 in Queluz), a footballer with 123 caps for the Portugal women's national football team

See also 

 Portuguese Riviera
 Queijada de Sintra
 Sintra Mountains

References

External links

 Municipality official website 
 UNESCO World Heritage Page 
 Sistema de Informação para o Património Arquitetónico - Registo da Unidade de Paisagem da Serra de Sintra
 Sintra Municipality Touristic Information

 
Municipalities of Lisbon District
Populated places in Lisbon District
Towns in Portugal
World Heritage Sites in Portugal